Laura Kathryn Wright (born 17 June 1990) is an English soprano. She is a classical-popular crossover singer who performs classical and operatic music, popular songs, musical theatre, and folk songs.

Early life
Wright was born in Suffolk, and grew up in Framlingham. She won a scholarship to attend the fee-paying Framlingham College.

Wright has three brothers.

Career
Wright's first notable achievement, at 14, was as chorister of the year.. She then went on to be a member of the group All Angels.

She has previously performed at men's and women's rugby matches at Twickenham. Wright has been a regular at the NFL matches and has performed at Rugby League, The Carnegie Challenge Cup Final, WSB Boxing, polo, the Carling Cup Final, The Championship Play-off Final and the FA Cup Final. In April 2016, she performed at The Grand National and, in July, she was the official anthem singer at the British Grand Prix.. In recent years however she has been less visible in this role.

In 2016, she wrote "Heroes"; the first official anthem of the England Women's Cricket team. She is also the first Ambassador for the Kia Women's Cricket League.

Wright performed at the opening ceremony for Prince Harry's inaugural Invictus Games where she debuted a new piece she wrote "Invincible", taken from her album Sound of Strength.

Wright was the first mezzo-soprano to perform at the Olympic Stadium, has toured with Alfie Boe and Russell Watson, opened the iTunes Festival for Andrea Bocelli and duetted with Donny Osmond for Children in Need.

She was involved in the Diamond Jubilee celebrations, via her song "Stronger As One". It secured a No. 1 chart position on Gary Barlow's Sing album.

Wright has trained to county level in hockey, netball, tennis and javelin.

On 10th September 2022, after the passing of Queen Elizabeth II, Laura sang a note-perfect rendition of "God Save The King" at the start of the third Test Match between England and South Africa at The Oval. This was the first time that version of the National Anthem had been officially sung at a sporting event in 70 years.  

Nominated for a Classical Brit Award, Wright went on to receive the PPL Classical Award at the Nordoff Robbins 02 Silver Clef Awards. Alongside her role as ambassador at Nordoff Robbins, Laura is an ambassador of Arthritis Research UK, having battled her own debilitating condition at a very young age. She is also an ambassador for SportsAid and for the Invictus Games.

Discography

Solo (albums)
 2011: The Last Rose (UK Albums Chart No. 24; Classical Charts No. 1)
 2012: Glorious (UK Albums Chart No. 52)
 2014: The Sound of Strength

With All Angels (albums)
 2006: All Angels
 2007: Into Paradise
 2009: Fly Away

Featured Artist
2012: "Stronger As One" (Sing)
2014: "Don't Give Up" (The Soundtrack of My Life)

References

1990 births
Living people
English sopranos
People from Mid Suffolk District
Alumni of the Royal College of Music
People educated at Framlingham College
Decca Records artists
People from Framlingham
21st-century English women singers
21st-century English singers
All Angels members